The 2003 NRL premiership was the 96th season of professional rugby league football in Australia and the sixth run by the National Rugby League.  Fifteen teams competed, with the Manly-Warringah Sea Eagles returning in place of their failed joint-venture club, the Northern Eagles. Ultimately, the Penrith Panthers defeated reigning champions, the Sydney Roosters in the 2003 NRL grand final, claiming their first premiership since 1991.

Season summary
Season 2003 brought in the new "golden point" extra time rule, where after 80 minutes, if the game was drawn, then 10 minutes of extra time was played until one team scored the winning point(s). The salary cap for the 2003 season was A$3.25 million per club for their 25 highest-paid players.

The first round of the Premiership improved on the previous year's in terms of attendance and television ratings. The major story this season was the resurgence of the Penrith Panthers, who defied the critics and naysayers to win their second premiership in their illustrious history since joining the competition in 1967. Coached by John Lang and captained by Craig Gower, the Panthers were the surprise minor premiers, dominating the competition despite consistent disparagement from many sources, and would continue their outstanding form in the finals, beating the Broncos, Warriors and finally the Roosters in the grand final.

The Dally M Medal ceremony was cancelled by the NRL after negotiations with the players' union, the Rugby League Professionals Association, stalled. All votes for the award were destroyed. It was later revealed that with one round of the regular season to play, Craig Gower was leading both Brad Fittler and Clinton Schifcofske by one point in the overall points tally. However, with the ceremony officially cancelled more than a week out from the awards, no points were allocated in the final round of the season.

At the end of the season, Chris Anderson would lose his job at Cronulla-Sutherland, while Peter Sharp was dismissed as the Sea Eagles coach. Trainer and former Manly star, Des Hasler would replace Sharp as head coach in 2004.

Also at the end of the season, a squad of players from the NRL premiership went on the 2003 Kangaroo tour.

A major flaw of the fixture was that the previous season's Grand Finalists, the New Zealand Warriors and Sydney Roosters, did not meet until the penultimate round of the regular season.

Teams
The lineup of fifteen teams for the 2003 premiership remained unchanged from the previous season, except that the Manly-Warringah Sea Eagles rejoined the competition since their merger with North Sydney Bears in 1999, taking the place of the failed Northern Eagles. This ended North Sydney's representation in the League.

Records and statistics
Anthony Minichiello ran 4,571 metres with the ball in 2003, more than any other player in the competition.
Nathan Brown became the youngest non-playing coach in premiership history at the age of 29. Brown had retired from playing in 2001 after a neck injury in a trial game.
Referee Bill Harrigan's tenth grand final in 2003, the final match of his career, stands as the record for the most grand finals officiated by a referee.
On 23 August the Parramatta Eels beat the Cronulla-Sutherland Sharks 74–4, at the time the third highest winning margin for a club game in Australian rugby league history.
Also on 23 August, the North Queensland Cowboys beat the South Sydney Rabbitohs 60–8, the biggest win and most points in a match in Cowboys history.
The Brisbane Broncos set a record for their longest losing streak, from round 20 to the 4th qualifying final. This was equalled again from round 22, 2005 to round 1, 2006 inclusive, and then broken when the club lost thirteen consecutive matches between round 10, 2020 and round 2, 2021 inclusive.
The Penrith Panthers became the first team to win the minor premiership and hold bottom spot on the ladder in the same season.
The Penrith Panthers won 8 matches in a row from 19 April - 7 June, most wins in a row in the club's history. This was broken in season 2020, when the club won seventeen consecutive matches between round six and the preliminary final inclusive.
The Bulldogs equalled their worst defeat with a 50–4 loss to the Melbourne Storm in round 22.
The Brisbane Broncos suffered their worst ever defeat at Suncorp Stadium, losing to the Bulldogs 40–4 in round 18. This was later eclipsed by a 56–18 loss to the New Zealand Warriors in round 12, 2013, and then again with a 59–0 loss to the Sydney Roosters in round 4, 2020. They also only recorded one victory at the Stadium in season 2003, which came two weeks earlier with a 10–8 win over the Sydney Roosters (who, at that time had not won at Suncorp since 1991, however this drought ended in 2005).

Advertising
In 2003 the NRL sacked their advertising agency of the previous two years, Saatchi & Saatchi Sydney, and took the unusual step of coming up with their own in-house creative concept. Former Cronulla-Sutherland Sharks player and then current Parramatta Eels assistant coach Alan Wilson hit upon the idea of using the Hoodoo Gurus' 1987 hit "What's My Scene?" with reworked lyrics as "That's My Team".

"and another thing, I'm discovering lately, I'm a bit crazy, for my rugby league team "

Wilson is a friend of Hoodoo Gurus singer Dave Faulkner and made the necessary arrangements which included re-uniting the band to re-record the track.  Faulkner is a long-time supporter of the Sharks and the original film clip of "What's My Scene?" had included shots of band members in Wests and Cronulla-Sutherland jumpers.

The ad focuses on the grass roots supporters at all levels of the game and in its finished version includes shots of fans from the Cessnock Goannas, a proud Bulldogs supporter and a Penrith teenager with a broken leg signed by her heroes. These images are included with the usual fare of pre-season team training images, big-hits, clever passes and post-try celebrations.

To produce the ad the League returned to the agency who created and produced the Tina Turner campaigns from 1989 to 1995 - Hertz Walpole Advertising by now renamed MJW Hakuhodo.

Regular season

Bold – Home game
X – Bye
* – Golden point game
Opponent for round listed above margin

Ladder

Finals series

Finals Chart

Grand Final

Player statistics
The following statistics are as of the conclusion of Round 26.

Top 5 point scorers

Top 5 try scorers

Top 5 goal scorers

2003 Transfers

Players

Sources and footnotes

External links
 NRL official website
 2003 NRL "That's My Team" Season Advertisement
 2003 NRL Grand Final  at sportsphotography.net